Michelangelo Carducci was a 16th-century Italian painter of the Renaissance period active in Umbria. He was born in Norcia. Extant works include:
Resurrection of Lazarus, fresco in the Basilica of San Benedetto, Norcia (signed and dated 1560)
Crucifixion with the Virgin and St. John, fresco in the church of Santa Maria della Misericordia, Spello (1562)

People from Norcia
16th-century Italian painters
Italian male painters
Umbrian painters
Renaissance painters